Colombians are people identified with the country of Colombia. This connection may be residential, legal, historical or cultural. For most Colombians, several (or all) of these connections exist and are collectively the source of their being Colombian.

Colombia is a multiethnic society and home to people of various ethnic, religious and national origins. Though many Colombians have varying degrees of European, Indigenous, African, Arab and Asian ancestry.

The majority of the Colombian population is made up of immigrants from the Old World and their descendants, mixed in part with the original populations, especially Iberians and to a lesser extent other Europeans. Following the initial period of Spanish conquest and immigration, different waves of immigration and settlement of non-indigenous peoples took place over the course of nearly six centuries and continue today. Elements of Native American and more recent immigrant customs, languages and religions have combined to form the culture of Colombia and thus a modern Colombian identity.

Ethnic groups

Mestizo Colombians

Estimates of the Mestizo or Mixed population in Colombia vary widely, as Colombia's national census does not distinguish between White and Mestizo Colombians. According to the 2018 census, the Mestizo and White population combined make up approximately 87% of the Colombian population, but there is no official estimate of the mestizo population exclusively.
Genetic studies estimate that admixture of Colombians varies between 62.5% European, 27.4% Amerindian, 9.2% African and 0.9% East Asian ancestry in 2015; and 73% European, 20.4% Amerindian, and 6.6% African ancestry in 2018. One of the highest European heredities in Latin America as shown in studies.

European Colombians

Most White Colombians descend from Spanish settlers, while other Europeans arrived during the 19th and 20th centuries. These migrations primarily brought  Italian, German (including Ashkenazi Jewish), French, and British (including Irish) 
immigrants mostly to the Caribbean and Andean regions. There are smaller numbers of Dutch, Swiss, Austrians, Danish, Norwegian, Portuguese, Belgian, Russian, Polish, Hungarian, Bulgarian, Lithuanian, Ukrainian, Czech, Greek and Croatian communities that immigrated during the Second World War and the Cold War.

Native American Colombians

Originally, Colombia's territory was inhabited entirely by Amerindian groups. Colombia's indigenous cultures evolved from three main groups—the Quimbayas, who inhabited the western slopes of the Cordillera Central; the Chibchas; and the Kalina (Caribs). The Muisca culture, a subset of the larger Chibcha ethnic group and famous for their use of gold, were responsible for the legend of El Dorado. Today Native American people comprise roughly 4.4% of the population in Colombia. More than fifty different indigenous ethnic groups inhabit Colombia. Most of them speak languages belonging to the Chibchan and Cariban language families.Historically there are 567 reserves (resguardos) established for Native American peoples and they are inhabited by more than 800,000 people. The 1991 constitution established that their native languages are official in their territories, and most of them have bilingual education systems teaching both native languages and Spanish. Some of the largest indigenous groups are the Wayuu, the Zenú, the Pastos, the Embera and the Páez. The departments (departamentos) with the biggest indigenous population are Cauca, La Guajira, Nariño, Cordoba and Sucre.

Asian Colombians

Colombia's Asian community is generally made up of people of West Asian descent, particularly the Lebanese, Syrian, Israelis and Palestinian though there are also smaller communities of East Asian, South Asian and Southeast Asian ancestry. West Asians, particularly Levantine immigrants from the Ottoman Empire came in the late 19th and 20th centuries. In 1928, several Japanese families settled in Valle del Cauca where they came as farmers to grow crops. Between 1970 and 1980, it was estimated that there were more than 6,000 Chinese immigrants in Colombia. In 2014, it was estimated that there were 25,000 Chinese living in Colombia. Their current communities are found in Bogotá, Barranquilla, Cali, Cartagena, Medellín, Santa Marta, Manizales, Cucutá and Pereira. There are additional Asian populations that immigrated to Colombia in smaller numbers, such as Iranians, Indians, Koreans, Filipinos and Pakistanis.

West Asian Colombians

Many Colombians have origins in the Western Asian countries of Lebanon, Jordan, Syria and Palestine, It is estimated that Arab Colombians represent 3.2 million people. Many moved to Colombia to escape the repression of the Turkish Ottoman Empire and/or financial hardships. When they were first processed in Colombia's ports, they were classified as "Turks". It is estimated that Colombia has a Lebanese population of 700,000 direct descendants and 1,500,000 who have partial ancestry. Meanwhile, the Palestine population is estimated between 100,000 and 120,000. Most Syrian-Lebanese immigrants established themselves in the Caribbean Region of Colombia in the towns of Santa Marta, Santa Cruz de Lorica, Fundación, Aracataca, Ayapel, Calamar, Ciénaga, Cereté, Montería and Barranquilla near the basin of the Magdalena River, in La Guajira Department, notably in Maicao and in the Archipelago of San Andrés, Providencia and Santa Catalina. Many Arab-Colombians adapted their names and surnames to the Spanish language to assimilate more quickly in their communities. Some Colombian surnames of Arab origin include: Guerra (originally Harb), Domínguez (Ñeca), Durán (Doura), Lara (Larach), Cristo (Salibe), among other surnames.

There are about 8,000 Colombians of Jewish origin who practice Judaism, most of them live in Bogotá. Colombia's Jewish community includes Sephardi Jews from countries such as Syria and Turkey also immigrated to the country and run their independent religious organizations. The Confederación de Comunidades Judías de Colombia coordinates Jews and institutions that practice the religion.

Consequently, there were other immigrants from the Western Asia, including a number of Armenian, Turkish, Georgian and Cypriot immigrants who arrived in the country during the early 20th century.

Afro-Colombians

Also known as "Afro", or "Afro-colombianos" (in Spanish). According to the 2018 census, they are 9.34% of country population, while genetic studies have obtained between 6.6%  9.2  and 11% of African DNA in the Colombian population. Also the % and numbers of Afro Colombians can vary depending on the region, being the majority population in the Pacific Region, frequently found in the Caribbean Region but a minority in the Andean Region, Orinoquia Region and Amazon Region. Historians and Geographers from all over the world have agreed that Colombia has the 4th largest African diaspora on the planet after the USA, Brazil and Haiti.

Immigrant groups 

Because of its strategic location Colombia has received several immigration waves during its history. Most of these immigrants have settled in the Caribbean Coast; Barranquilla (the largest city in the Colombian Caribbean Coast) and other Caribbean cities have the largest population of Lebanese, German, British, French, Italian, Irish and Romani descendants. There are also important communities of American and Chinese descendants in the Caribbean Coast. Most immigrants are Venezuelans, they are evenly distributed throughout the country.

Languages

There are 101 languages listed for Colombia in the Ethnologue database, of which 80 are spoken today as living languages. There are about 500,000 speakers of indigenous languages in Colombia today.

Education

The educational experience of many Colombian children begins with attendance at a preschool academy until age five (Educación preescolar). Basic education (Educación básica) is compulsory by law. It has two stages: Primary basic education (Educación básica primaria) which goes from first to fifth grade – children from six to ten years old, and Secondary basic education (Educación básica secundaria), which goes from sixth to ninth grade. Basic education is followed by Middle vocational education (Educación media vocacional) that comprises the tenth and eleventh grades. It may have different vocational training modalities or specialties (academic, technical, business, and so on.) according to the curriculum adopted by each school.

After the successful completion of all the basic and middle education years, a high-school diploma is awarded. The high-school graduate is known as a  bachiller, because secondary basic school and middle education are traditionally considered together as a unit called bachillerato (sixth to eleventh grade). Students in their final year of middle education take the ICFES test (now renamed Saber 11) in order to gain access to higher education (Educación superior). This higher education includes undergraduate professional studies, technical, technological and intermediate professional education, and post-graduate studies.

Bachilleres (high-school graduates) may enter into a professional undergraduate career program offered by a university; these programs last up to five years (or less for technical, technological and intermediate professional education, and post-graduate studies), even as much to six to seven years for some careers, such as medicine. In Colombia, there is not an institution such as college; students go directly into a career program at a university or any other educational institution to obtain a professional, technical or technological title. Once graduated from the university, people are granted a (professional, technical or technological) diploma and licensed (if required) to practice the career they have chosen. For some professional career programs, students are required to take the Saber-Pro test, in their final year of undergraduate academic education.

Public spending on education as a proportion of gross domestic product in 2012 was 4.4%. This represented 15.8% of total government expenditure. In 2012, the primary and secondary gross enrolment ratios stood at 106.9% and 92.8% respectively. School-life expectancy was 13.2 years. A total of 93.6% of the population aged 15 and older were recorded as literate, including 98.2% of those aged 15–24.

Religion

The National Administrative Department of Statistics (DANE) does not collect religious statistics, and accurate reports are difficult to obtain. However, based on various studies and a survey, about 90% of the population adheres to Christianity, the majority of which (70.9%) are Roman Catholic, while a significant minority (16.7%) adhere to Protestantism (primarily Evangelicalism). Some 4.7% of the population is atheist or agnostic, while 3.5% claim to believe in God but do not follow a specific religion. 1.8% of Colombians adhere to Jehovah's Witnesses and Adventism and less than 1% adhere to other religions, such as Islam, Judaism, Buddhism, Mormonism, Hinduism, Indigenous religions, Hare Krishna movement, Rastafari movement, Eastern Orthodox Church, and spiritual studies. The remaining people either did not respond or replied that they did not know. In addition to the above statistics, 35.9% of Colombians reported that they did not practice their faith actively.

While Colombia remains a mostly Roman Catholic country by baptism numbers, the 1991 Colombian constitution guarantees freedom and equality of religion.

See also

 List of Colombians
 Colombian diaspora
 Culture of Colombia
 Colombia in Popular Culture
 Colombian Americans
 Colombian Canadians
 Colombian Mexicans
 Colombians in Spain
 Colombians in Uruguay
 Hispanics

References

 
people
South American people by nationality